Giru is a town and coastal locality in the Shire of Burdekin, Queensland, Australia, situated on the Haughton River,  south-east of Townsville.

Geography 
Giru is mainly sugarcane farms. The Invicta sugar mill in Giru is owned by Wilmar Sugar Cane Limited with three iconic chimney stacks.

The Bruce Highway bypasses the town.

History

The name of the town and the locality derives from the railway station name, assigned on 31 March 1916, derived from "goru", a type name for a species of sugarcane from New Guinea which was successfully experimented with and widely grown in the district.

The Invicta Sugar Mill was originally located on the Richmond River in New South Wales. In 1906, it was relocated to Bucca near the Kolan River near Bundaberg. In 1919, it was moved north to the Haughton River in the Burdekin district, where the township of Giru grew around it. It commenced crushing there under the same name on 4 August 1921.

On Saturday 1 May 1926, the School of Arts Hall was officially opened with a dance.

The Giru Post Office opened by 1922.

Giru State School opened on 1 October 1924. The school celebrated its golden jubilee (50th anniversary) in 1974.

St Joseph's School opened in 1945 and closed in 1998.

Economy
Giru is noted for the Invicta Sugar Mill, which is owned by Wilmar Sugar. The company crushes 3.67 million tonnes of sugar cane annually, the second largest amount in the Southern Hemisphere after Victoria Mill in Ingham.

Education 
Giru State School is a government primary (Prep-6) school for boys and girls at Luxton Street. In 2017, the school had an enrolment of 46 students with 4 teachers (3 full-time equivalent) and 4 non-teaching staff (3 full-time equivalent).

Amenities 

There is a bowling club, and the main source of accommodation is the Giru International Hotel.

The Giru branch of the Queensland Country Women's Association meets at the CWA Hall at 9 Carey Street.

Giru School of Arts Hall is at 3 Invicta Steet.

Attractions 
There is serious game fishing in the region, as the barramundi and grunter are highly sought after. The boat ramp is a fishing hot spot and many people travel to fish there.

In September every year, the Giru Show is held, offering activities such as food stalls, homemade cake shops and show rides, horse rides, and an animal farm, as well as a display of several pieces of farming equipment.

The Palm Creek Folk Festival is an annual event held in Giru on the Queen's Birthday public holiday, and spans four days. It commonly features known and up-and-coming bands from several music genres, ranging from folk to alternative.

See also 
 Giru railway station
 Burdekin Shire
 List of tramways in Queensland

References

External links

 
 

Towns in Queensland
Shire of Burdekin
Coastline of Queensland
Localities in Queensland